Alice Lee is an American actress and singer. She is most known for originating the role of Heather Duke in the Off-Broadway production of Heathers: The Musical and for the role of Emily Kang on Zoey's Extraordinary Playlist. She is also a YouTuber.

Early life 
Lee is a native of North Shore, Chicago, grew up in Glenview, and attended Glenbrook South High School.

Career 
In 2009, Lee started her acting career in As the World Turns. Although Lee is of Korean descent, her character in Wish Upon, Gina, is Chinese. In 2014, Lee originated the role of Heather Duke in the Off-Broadway production of Heathers: The Musical at New Worlds Stages. However, Lee left Heathers to become a contestant on Rising Star, where she finished in 11th place. Lee has been in various movies like Brittany Runs a Marathon (2019) and Sierra Burgess Is a Loser (2018). Lee also plays the role of Emily in Zoey's Extraordinary Playlist (2020). While she originally auditioned for the role of Mo, she was instead offered the role of Zoey's sister-in-law on the series.

Filmography

Film

Television

Theatre

Discography

Selected theatrical roles
 Heathers the Musical as Heather Duke (2014)
 Bare: The Musical (Off-Broadway) as Diane (2012)
 Spider-Man: Turn Off the Dark as Miss Arrow
 Spring Awakening as Ensemble, Understudy Wendla, and replaced Wendla

References

External links

Lee, Alice
Living people
American film actresses
American television actresses
People from Glenview, Illinois
Actresses from Chicago
American actresses of Korean descent
21st-century American women